Problem of pain can mean:

 the problem of evil, the central concern of theodicy
 The Problem of Pain, a book about that topic by C. S. Lewis
 The Problem of Pain, a science fiction novella by Poul Anderson from 1973